L'amica is a 1969 Italian  film. It stars actor Gabriele Ferzetti.

Plot

Cast
Lisa Gastoni: Lisa Marchesi
Gabriele Ferzetti: Mario Marchesi
Elsa Martinelli: Carla Nervi
Jean Sorel: Franco Raimondi
Frank Wolff: Guido Nervi
Ray Lovelock: Claudio Nervi
: Giovanna
Sergio Serafini: assistant Dr. Nervi

References

External links

1969 films
Italian drama films
1960s Italian-language films
Films scored by Luis Bacalov
Films directed by Alberto Lattuada
1960s Italian films